Li Bingbing (born 27 February 1973) is a Chinese actress and singer who rose to fame with her role in Seventeen Years (1999) and since then received critical acclaim for her roles in A World Without Thieves (2004), Waiting Alone (2005), The Knot (2006), The Forbidden Kingdom (2008), The Message (2009), Detective Dee and the Mystery of the Phantom Flame (2010) and Zhong Kui: Snow Girl and the Dark Crystal (2015).

Li has also starred in Hollywood blockbusters Resident Evil: Retribution (2012), Transformers: Age of Extinction (2014) and The Meg (2018).

Li ranked 26th on Forbes China Celebrity 100 list in 2013, 28th in 2014, 13th in 2015, 29th in 2017, and 76th in 2019.

Early life and career 
Li Bingbing was born in Wuchang, Heilongjiang, China. She initially had no intention of becoming an actress and enrolled specifically in a high school for prospective school teachers. However, upon graduation, she discovered her interest in acting and was eventually persuaded by a friend to join the Shanghai Theatre Academy in 1993.

Li rose to fame after starring in Zhang Yuan's Seventeen Years (1999), which won her the Best Actress Award in the 1999 Singapore Film Festival. In 2001, Li starred in the television series Young Justice Bao, which propelled her to become one of the most famous actresses in China.

Li was subsequently labelled as an "action actress" as she starred in a number of wuxia television series, such as Taiji Prodigy and Eight Heroes.

Li achieved breakthrough with her performance in Feng Xiaogang's A World Without Thieves. She then starred in Dayyan Eng's romantic comedy film Waiting Alone, for which she received her first Best Actress nomination at the Golden Rooster Awards.

In 2009, Li won Best Actress at the 46th Golden Horse Film Awards for her performance in The Message, about Japanese invaders in China who try to ferret out a spy among their Chinese collaborators.

Li then starred in Tsui Hark's 2010 action-mystery film Detective Dee and the Mystery of the Phantom Flame. She played Shangguan Jing'er, a fictional character based on Shangguan Wan'er, a prestigious politician during the Tang Dynasty. She established her studio in the same year, co-starring and co-producing the film 1911 with Jackie Chan, which was released in September 2011 to celebrate the 100th anniversary of the Xinhai Revolution.

Career in Hollywood 

Li Bingbing's first-time in an English-language film is Wayne Wang's Snow Flower and the Secret Fan, adapted from Lisa See's 2005 novel of the same title. The film premiered at the 2011 Cannes Film Festival. Li started to gain recognition in Hollywood after starring in Resident Evil: Retribution, playing Ada Wong. The same year, she was cast in action fantasy film 400 Boys, directed by British director Alastair Paton.

In 2013, Li attended the 4th Annual US-China Film Summit and received the East-West Talent Award. Hollywood magazine Variety also named her Asian Star of the Year. The following year, Li featured in Transformers: Age of Extinction, the fourth installment of the film franchise. This helped solidify her success overseas.

In 2015, she was cast in 3D science fiction thriller Nest (also known as Guardians of the Tomb), a Chinese-Australian co-production that was finally released in January 2018. The same year, it was announced that Li would play China's first female superhero in upcoming film Realm, written by Stan Lee.

In 2018, Li starred with Jason Statham in The Meg, an American-Chinese shark film based on Steve Alten's 1997 novel Meg: A Novel of Deep Terror.

Ambassador roles 
 Charity Ambassador of the Shanghai World Expo
 Goodwill Ambassador of UNEP

Social activities 
Li Bingbing has established L.O.V.E, a charitable organization dedicated to the promotion of a positive, environmentally responsible lifestyle. She is also one of the founders of the two-year One Million-Tree Forest project, launched in efforts to change the climate environment and help local residents of Gansu Province, Southwest China, to increase their incomes. Her commitment to green and charitable causes has earned her the recognition as "the most influential global ambassador" from World Wildlife Fund.

On 24 July 2013, it was reported that Li has a godfather named Wang Lin, a qigong practitioner who claims to be able to conjure up snakes from thin air, cure disease, and retrieve an incinerated banknote intact from an orange. The Beijing News reported that Li Xue, Li's agent, responded that Li went to visit Wang Lin to ask him to cure her mother of her disease. As for the effectiveness of the cure, the agent refused to disclose any more information.

She is a member of China Zhi Gong Party.

Filmography

Film

Television

Awards and nominations

References

External links 

Li Bingbing at Hong Kong Movie DataBase
Li Bingbing at Hong Kong Cinemagic
 

1973 births
Living people
Chinese film actresses
Chinese television actresses
Chinese stage actresses
Mandarin-language singers
American film actresses
Shanghai Theatre Academy alumni
20th-century Chinese actresses
21st-century Chinese actresses
21st-century American actresses
Actresses from Harbin
Musicians from Harbin
Singers from Heilongjiang
21st-century Chinese women singers